Xu Liyi (born 13 August 1964) is a Chinese politician who served as party secretary of Zhengzhou from 2019 to 2022. He was removed from his post due to under-report the number of people who died or went missing during the 2021 Henan floods. He previously served as mayor of Hangzhou and before that, mayor and party secretary of Wenzhou. He is a delegate to the 13th National People's Congress.

Early life and education
Xu was born in Shaoxing, Zhejiang, on 13 August 1964. After resuming the college entrance examination, in 1979, he was accepted to Hangzhou University (now Zhejiang University), majoring in geography.

Career in Zhejiang
Xu got involved in politics in August 1983, joined the Chinese Communist Party (CCP) in May 1986. Xu worked in Yuyao, a county-level city the jurisdiction of Ningbo, from 1983 to 2001, and then Ningbo, from 2001 to 2006. In November 2006, he was transferred to Hangzhou, capital of Zhejiang, where he successively worked as party secretary of Jianggan District and Yuhang District. In March 2014, he became vice mayor of Hangzhou, but having held the position for only one year. He became mayor of Wenzhou in April 2015, and then party secretary, the top political position in the city, beginning in January 2016. In February 2017, he was promoted to acting mayor of Hangzhou, confirmed in April.

Career in Henan

In June 2019, he was assigned to central Henan province and appointed party secretary of its capital Zhengzhou. He was also admitted to member of the standing committee of the CCP Henan Provincial Committee, the province's top authority. During his tenure, the 2021 Henan floods broke out, Xu and his subordinates committed dereliction of duty and concealed 139 deaths and missing persons. On 21 January 2022, he has been given a serious warning as a measure of party discipline and had his civil servant rank downgraded.

References

1964 births
Living people
People from Shaoxing
Zhejiang University alumni
Central Party School of the Chinese Communist Party alumni
Mayors of Wenzhou
Mayors of Hangzhou
People's Republic of China politicians from Zhejiang
Chinese Communist Party politicians from Zhejiang
Delegates to the 13th National People's Congress